Patricia Zentilli (born November 27, 1975) is a Canadian performer who has worked in film, television and theatre across Canada.

Early life and education
Born in Kingston, Ontario but raised in Halifax, Nova Scotia, Patricia first performed in Grade Six when she was cast as "Dorothy" in her school's production of The Wizard of Oz. Patricia's first formal training as an actor was to study clowning at The Dmitri Theatre School in Verscio, Switzerland. After graduating from high school, Patricia lived in Togo as part of a Canada World Youth programme.

Upon her return to Canada, Patricia earned a B.A. in theatre at Dalhousie University in Halifax and then did further studies with "Shakespeare and Company" in Bennington, Vermont.

Career

Stage
Coming home to Nova Scotia, Patricia was cast in a number of productions with Neptune Theatre in roles that included "Shy Girl" in Sincerely, A Friend, "Frankie" in The Member of the Wedding with Jackie Richardson "Marty" in Grease, "Ophelia" in Hamlet, "Geraldine" in What the Butler Saw and "Curley's Wife" in Of Mice and Men.
Patricia made her Canadian Stage Company (Toronto) debut playing the role of "Little Becky Two Shoes" in their production of Urinetown. In 2005, she starred as "Cathy" in Jason Robert Brown's The Last Five Years at the Manitoba Theatre Centre (Winnipeg) opposite Adam Brazier.

In November 2007, Patricia was invited back by CanStage to star in their production of Little Shop of Horrors.
Ron Pederson played "Seymour", and Ted Dykstra directed. Patricia's portrayal of "Audrey", the bruised flower shop girl with a heart of gold, garnered numerous accolades from esteemed theatre critics across Toronto as well as a nomination for a 2007-2008 Dora Mavor Moore Award.
Patricia returned to Nova Scotia to play "Brooke"/"Vicki" in the Atlantic Theatre Festival's production of Noises Off, for which she won the 2007 Robert Merritt Award for Outstanding Supporting Actress.

TV and film
In 1999 Patricia landed a principal role in the successful Canadian film New Waterford Girl, which went on to win awards at the Toronto International Film Festival. Around the same time, Patricia landed a recurring role as Bunny on the cult sci-fi television series Lexx, for which she still has a loyal fan following.

Patricia has made numerous guest appearances on television series that include The Chris Isaak Show, The Sean Cullen Show, Angela's Eyes, Naked Josh, This is Wonderland, Wonderfalls, Blue Murder, The Gavin Crawford Show, Made in Canada and The Rick Mercer Report. In 2003 she played "Lynn" in Scott Simpson and Michael Melski's film Touch & Go
In 2006/2007 Patricia was seen once again on television as "Susan" in Global's The Jane Show, a television series that was co-written, produced and starred Teresa Pavlinek.

Music
Patricia performs as a singer and cabaret artist and has sung jazz, cabaret, folk and musical theatre in venues in both Toronto, Edmonton and Halifax.

Personal life
She has one child, her daughter, Melody Marcos Timoteo, was born in October 2010.

Partial filmography
#Roxy (2018).... Gail Nollen
The Jane Show (TV) (Series Regular) (2006–2007) .... Susan
Blue Murder (TV) (3 episodes) (2003–2004).... Bonnie Urquhart
Street Time (TV) (3 episodes) (2002–2003).... Bonnie Abrams
Beyond Belief: Fact or Fiction (TV) (1 segment/"Seven Hours of Bad Luck") 2002.... Lauren
Lexx (TV) (Series Regular) (1999–2002).... Bunny Priest
A Nero Wolfe Mystery (TV) ("Champagne for One," 2001).... Faith Usher
Songs in Ordinary Time (TV) (2000) .... Bernadette Mansaw
Earth: Final Conflict (TV) (Sins of the Father) (2000) .... Eva Gale
Catch a Falling Star (TV) (2000) .... Allison Hampton
New Waterford Girl (1999) .... Patty

References

External links

1970 births
Living people
Actresses from Halifax, Nova Scotia
Actresses from Kingston, Ontario
Canadian film actresses
Canadian television actresses